Nick Heffernan (born 12 June 1974) is an Australian fencer. He competed in the individual and team épée events at the 2000 Summer Olympics.

References

External links
 

1974 births
Living people
Australian male fencers
Olympic fencers of Australia
Fencers at the 2000 Summer Olympics
Sportspeople from Melbourne